Long Creek School may refer to one of these United States subjects:

Long Creek School (Blair, Nebraska), a building listed on the National Register of Historic Places (NRHP) in Nebraska
Long Creek School (Oregon), a public school in Long Creek, Oregon
Long Creek School (Lafayette, Tennessee), a building listed on the NRHP in Tennessee